For other people with this surname, see Torquemada

Antonio de Torquemada (circa 1507, León, Spain - 1569), was a Spanish writer of the Renaissance.

He studied humanities in Salamanca. Between 1528 and 1530 he lived in Italy and he was secretary of the Count of Benavente.

He composed popular works that were translated in France, Italy and England. His Satirical Colloquies are developed in a pastoral frame, that is an advance to the pastoral literature. Two of his famous works, Don Olivante de Laura and  Garden of Peculiar flowers were mentioned by Miguel de Cervantes in the first part of Quijote. His complete works were published in the '90s in Madrid.

Work
 The Game (Valencia, 1547) - Lost
 Satirical Colloquies (Mondoñedo, 1553)
 Don Olivante de Laura (Barcelona, 1564) - A book of cavalries
 Garden of Peculiar flowers (Salamanca, 1570)
 Manual of Writers (1574) - For secretaries

References

Spanish male writers
University of Salamanca alumni
1569 deaths
1507 births